In the game of poker, a betting round is said to be closed if no player will have the right to raise in the round.  Normally this occurs when a player calls, and the next player whose turn it is to act is the one who made the last raise, so he cannot raise further (this ends the betting round).  The round can also said to be closed before it has actually ended if there are still players remaining to act, but they will not be entitled to raise either because the last raise was a sub-minimum all-in raise (see poker table stakes rules) or because the limit ("cap") on allowed raises has been reached.

The term is also used to describe a category of poker game in which no cards held by individual players are visible to any other player before the showdown.  Most forms of draw poker are closed games (draw games with a rollout are an exception).  Most forms of stud poker, in contrast, are open games, because some players' cards are dealt face up or are exposed during play (blind stud games are an exception).  Most community card poker games like Texas hold 'em are considered closed as well, because the only cards exposed before showdown belong to everyone; the individual players' cards are never seen until showdown.

Strategic implications
A player who closes the betting round by calling or overcalling is entitled to greater freedom by doing so, since he does not face the threat of subsequent raises. This is especially true when comparing limit hold'em games with a standard cap (3 raises) to an elevated cap (4 raises) or capless game. A player can cap with as much as 80% of his flat calling range when he knows he cannot be forced out of the pot and no opponent can make his hand appear much stronger by raising. This is particularly correct when closing the action on the river in Texas hold'em or on the 7th street in stud poker, where a player can make calldowns with hands that are unlikely to win simply because of the pot odds he is getting and the fact he cannot be bluffed out of the pot.

See also
Glossary of poker terms

Poker gameplay and terminology